The 30th Golden Horse Awards (Mandarin:第30屆金馬獎) took place on December 4, 1993 at Sun Yat-sen Memorial Hall in Taipei, Taiwan.

References

30th
1993 film awards
1993 in Taiwan